Patrizia Vicinelli (Bologna, 23 August 1943 – 9 January 1991) was an Italian poet, writer, artist and actress.

Life
Vincinelli was born in Bologna. She enrolled in college to become a literary professor but never completed her studies. In the early 1960s, she performed sound poetry and concrete poetry. In 1966, she attended a conference held in La Spezia by the avant-garde literary group  and was later invited to become a member. She contributed to literary magazines such as Alfabeta, Doc(k)s, Marcatré, Ex and Quindici. Her work in experimental theatre and contemporary music brought her to collaborate with poets and writers such as Emilio Villa, Adriano Spatola and Franco Beltrametti. She also performed in avant-garde films such as  In viaggio con Patrizia (1965) and Virulentia (1967) by Alberto Grifi, La Notte e il giorno by Gianni Castagnoli (1967) and Toxic Love by Claudio Caligari (1983).

Vicinelli died in Bologna in 1991.

Selected bibliography
 à,a.A, Lerici, Milan, 1967
 Ezio Gribaudo: Il peso del concreto, Edizioni d'Arte Fratelli Pozzo, Turin, 1967
 Continuum: Foglio a redazione collettiva, no. 4, Continuum, Naples, 1970
 Signos Espacio Arte – exposicion internacional de la poesia concreta al arte conceptual, Club Pueblo, Madrid, 1973
 Arti visive, poesia visiva, Editrice Magma, Rome, 1974
 Oggi Poesia Domani. Rassegna internazionale di poesia visuale e fonetica, Fiuggi Editore, Frosinone, 1979
 El Lissitzky: Due quadrati, Tau/ma, Bologna, 1979
 Apology of a Schizoid Woman, Tau/ma, Bologna, 1979
 Il colpo di glottide. La poesia come fisicità e materia, Vallecchi Editore, Florence, 1980
 Mini 3, Scorribanda Productions, Riva San Vitale, Switzerland, 1986
 Non sempre ricordano, AElia Laelia, Bologna, 1986
 Scrittura visuale in Italia 1912-1972, Galleria Civica di Arte Moderna e Contemporanea, Turin, 1973
 Nanni Balestrini, Franco Vaccari, Patrizia Vicinelli: A Column, a Bar, a Voice, Archivio di Nuova Scrittura, Milan, 1994

Further reading
 Renato Pedio (ed.), Patrizia Vicinelli: Opere, Scheiwiller, Milan, 1994.
 Cecilia Bello Minciacchi (ed.), Patrizia Vicinelli: Non sempre ricordano. Poesia prosa performance, Le Lettere, Florence, 2009. 
 V. A., Chicago Quarterly Review Volume 20: The Italian Issue, Create Space Independent Publishing Platform, Chicago, 2015.

References

External links 
 

1943 births
1991 deaths
Gruppo 63
Italian women poets
20th-century Italian poets
20th-century Italian actresses
Writers from Bologna
20th-century Italian women writers